Shankol is a village in Nookat District of Osh Region of Kyrgyzstan. Its population was 2,182 in 2021.

References

Populated places in Osh Region